Msila is a commune in the Taza Province of the Taza-Al Hoceima-Taounate administrative region of Morocco. At the time of the 2004 census, the commune had a total population of 10153 people living in 1626 households.

References

Populated places in Taza Province
Rural communes of Fès-Meknès